Limanny is a rural locality (a settlement) and the administrative center of Limannoye Rural Settlement, Pallasovsky District, Volgograd Oblast, Russia. The population was 693 as of 2010. There are 11 streets.

Geography 
Limanny is located on the left bank of the Torgun River, 17 km east of Pallasovka (the district's administrative centre) by road. Zalivnoy is the nearest rural locality.

References 

Rural localities in Pallasovsky District